Avinurme Parish was a rural municipality of Ida-Viru County in northern Estonia.

Settlements
Small borough
Avinurme

Villages
Adraku, Alekere, Änniksaare, Kaevussaare, Kiissa, Kõrve, Kõrvemetsa, Kõveriku, Laekannu, Lepiksaare, Maetsma, Paadenurme, Sälliksaare, Tammessaare, Ulvi, Vadi

References

Former municipalities of Estonia